The people of the Trobriand Islands are mostly subsistence horticulturalists who live in traditional settlements. The social structure is based on matrilineal clans that control land and resources. People participate in the regional circuit of exchange of shells called kula, sailing to visit trade partners on seagoing canoes. In the late twentieth century, anti-colonial and cultural autonomy movements gained followers from the Trobriand societies. When inter-group warfare was forbidden by colonial rulers, the islanders developed a unique, aggressive form of cricket.

Although an understanding of reproduction and modern medicine is widespread in Trobriand society, their traditional beliefs have been remarkably resilient. For example, the real cause of pregnancy is believed to be a baloma, or ancestral spirit, that enters the body of a woman, and without whose existence a woman could not become pregnant; all babies are made or come into existence (ibubulisi) in Tuma. These tenets form the main stratum of what can be termed popular or universal belief. In the past, many held this traditional belief because the yam, a major food of the island, included chemicals (phytoestrogens and plant sterols) whose effects are contraceptive, so the practical link between sex and pregnancy was not very evident.

Language
The Trobriand peoples speak Kilivila, though various different dialects of it are spoken amongst each different tribe. It is an Austronesian language, although has the distinction of having a complex system for classifying nouns. Foreign languages are less commonly spoken, although by the 1980s at least, Trobrianders occasionally spoke Tok Pisin and English. The term "Trobriand" itself is not Kilivilan: the islands take this name from the French explorer Jean François Sylvestre Denis de Trobriand who visited in 1793.

Drawing upon earlier work by Bronisław Malinowski, Dorothy D. Lee's scholarly writings refer to "non-lineal codifications of reality". In such a linguistic system, the concept of linear progress of time, geometric shapes, and even conventional methods of description, are lost altogether or altered. In her example of a specific indigenous yam, Lee explains that when the yam moves from a state of sprouting through ripeness to over-ripeness, the name for each object in a specific state changes entirely – the description of the object at different states of development relates to wholly different perceptions of the object. Ripeness is considered a "defining ingredient" and thus once it becomes over-ripe, a yam is perceived as a new object altogether. The same perception pertains to time and geometric shapes.

Food
In Trobriand society, it is taboo to eat in front of others. As Jennifer Shute noted, "the Trobrianders eat alone, retiring to their own hearths with their portions, turning their backs on one another and eating rapidly for fear of being observed." However, it is perfectly acceptable to chew betel nuts, particularly when mixed with some pepper plant and slaked lime to make the nut less bitter. The betel nut acts as a stimulant and is commonly used by Trobrianders, causing their teeth to often appear red. Because in the past food was often scarce, to boast of having food is one of the Trobriand Islanders' chief glories and ambitions. Though food is most important, and the subject of food is most discussed, at Miamala, the annual time of harvest and feasting, the islanders can face hunger and scarcity due to poor growing conditions at any time of year. In mid-2009, the problem of population pressure, leading to food insecurity, received much national and international media attention.

Marriage customs
At seven or eight years of age, Trobriand children begin to play erotic games with each other and imitate adult seductive attitudes. About four or five years later, they begin to pursue sexual partners. They change partners often. Women are just as assertive and dominant as men in pursuing or refusing a lover. This is not only allowed, but encouraged.

In the Trobriand Islands, there is no traditional marriage ceremony. A young woman stays in her lover's house instead of leaving it before sunrise. The man and woman sit together in the morning and wait for the bride's mother to bring them cooked yams. The married couple eat together for about a year, and then go back to eating separately. Once the man and woman eat together, the marriage is officially recognized.

When a Trobriand couple want to marry each other, they show their interest by sleeping together, spending time together, and staying with each other for several weeks. The girl's parents approve of the couple when a girl accepts a gift from a boy. After that, the girl moves to the boy's house, eats her meals there, and accompanies her husband all day. Then word goes out that the boy and girl are married.

A married couple may get divorced after one year if the woman in the relationship is unhappy with her husband. A married couple may also get divorced if the husband chooses another woman. The man may try to go back with the woman he left by giving her family yams and other gifts, but it is ultimately up to the woman if she wants to be with that man.

Magic
Trobriands believe that conception is the result of an ancestral spirit entering the woman's body. Even after a child is born, it is the mother's brother, not the father, who presents a harvest of yams to his sister so that her child will be fed with food from its own matrilineage, not the father's.

The Trobrianders practice many traditional magic spells. Young people learn spells from older kin in exchange for food, tobacco, and money. Spells are often partially or fully lost because the old people give away only a few lines at a time to keep getting gifts. Often, the old person dies before they finish passing on the spells. Trobrianders believe that no one can make up a new magic spell.

Sometimes a man gives a woman magic spells because he wants to give her more than betel nuts or tobacco. People also buy and sell spells. Literate villagers write their magic spells in books and hide them. A person may direct magic spells toward heightening the visual and olfactory effects of their body to induce erotic feelings in their lover. Some spells are thought to make a person beautiful, even those who would normally be considered ugly. The beauty magic words are chanted into coconut oil, and then a person rubs it onto their skin, or into flowers and herbs that decorate their armbands and hair.

Cricket 
After tribal conflict was banned, cricket became a replacement for war in the Trobriand culture. The colonial powers were appalled with the violence and sexual displays associated with tribal warfare. Matches are often played between all male teams and last for several months. There are often feasts for the winning team. While regular cricket is played around the world, these islanders add their own elements which reflect their culture. For example, since this sport resembles war there is no limit on team size. Also, every time a team scores there is a special dance ritual involved. These dances are an adaptation of the former war rituals. Therefore, they consist of taunts and jeers often criticizing the other team. "The words are sexual metaphors, used as one team taunts the other and exhibits their physical and sexual prowess to the appraising eyes of the young women on the sidelines"

Often, there is also magic involved in this sporting event. Teams will use charms and incantations to gain an advantage in the match. For example, a spell could be used to make the team less efficient in scoring. The visiting team is expected to lose when visiting a rival island. However, when this is not the case, there are often reports of vandalism and arson when matches end unfavorably for the home team. During such events, yam houses are burned which is considered a major insult. In essence, this form of cricket has a more aggressive feel and is an important part of Trobriand life.

Currency
Trobrianders use yams as currency, and consider them a sign of wealth and power. 
Western visitors will often buy items from the Trobrianders using money. There is also a Kula exchange, which is a very important tradition among the Trobriand Islands. The women also use bundles of scored banana leaves.

Yam exchanges
Each year, a man grows yams for his sister, and his daughter if she is married. The husband does not provide yams to his wife. The more yams a woman receives, the more powerful and rich she is. The husband is expected to give his wife's father or brother a gift in turn for the yams they give his wife. When the woman is first married, she receives yams from her father until the woman's brother thinks his sister and her husband are old enough for him to give the yams.

At the beginning of the yam harvest, the yams stay on display in gardens for about a month before the gardener takes them to the owner. The owner is always a woman. There is a great ceremony for this every year. The yams are loaded into the woman's husband's empty yam house. Young people come to the gardens dressed in their most festive traditional clothes early on the day the yams are delivered to the yam house. The young people are all related to the gardener, and carry the yam baskets to the owner's hamlet. When they get to the owner's hamlet, they sing out to announce the arrival of the yams while thrusting out their hips in a sexually provocative motion. This emphasizes the relation between yams and sexuality. A few days later, the gardener comes and loads the yam house, and the man is now responsible for the yam.

The yam house owner provides the gardener and young people with cooked yams, taro, and pork. Sometimes no pig is killed, perhaps because the yam house owner did not have a pig to spare. The yam house owner also may decide not kill a pig for the gardener because he is unsatisfied with the number of yams, or is angry with the gardener for another reason. Once the yam houses are full, a man performs a special magic spell for the hamlet that wards off hunger by making people feel full. The women also use bundles of scored banana leaves as a type of currency between themselves. As many days of work are required to make the bundles,  each one has an assigned value and can be used to buy canned food, or in exchange for other goods.

Death
When a person dies, mourning continues for months. The spouse is joined in mourning by female kin and the dead person's father's sisters. These villagers stay in the house and cry four times a day. If someone who did not attend the funeral comes to the village, he or she must immediately join in on the mourning that is taking place. Other workers observe many of the mourning taboos. Most of them shave their heads. People closely related to the deceased avoid eating "good food." Those more distantly related may wear black clothes. Before this, however, everyone receives a payment from the owners for the part they had in the burial process.

The first set of exchanges takes place the day after burial and involves yams, taro, and small amounts of money. The spouse, the spouse's matrilineage, and the dead person's father or father's representative, and members of his matrilineage get the largest distribution.

Missionisation
'Missionisation' has had a mixed effect on daily Triobriand life. Most of the islanders adhere to native tribal traditions. In an attempt to counter this, missionaries who are experienced with animist tribes are sometimes sent. Such missionaries may, for example, try to insert Christian blessings in traditional funeral ceremonies.

References

Ethnic groups in Papua New Guinea
Trobriand Islands